Edsel Chase (born 10 December 1968) is a Barbadian sprinter. He competed in the men's 4 × 400 metres relay at the 1992 Summer Olympics.

References

1968 births
Living people
Athletes (track and field) at the 1992 Summer Olympics
Athletes (track and field) at the 1995 Pan American Games
Barbadian male sprinters
Olympic athletes of Barbados
Place of birth missing (living people)
Pan American Games competitors for Barbados